Ernesto Degumbis Lariosa, also known as Nyor Erning, (December 11, 1944 – August 20, 2019) was a Filipino Visayan writer, poet, and columnist from Cebu, Philippines and a three-time Palanca awardee in Cebuano short story. In 2003, he was recognized by the Cebu City government as the "Vanguard of Cebuano Literature".

Personal life 
Lariosa was born in Tabionan, a mountainous area in San Fernando, Cebu on December 11, 1944, and grew up in the neighboring town of Panadtaran where his family settled after World War II. He earned bachelor's degrees, a degree in law, and a degree in education major in English and history from Southwestern University. He was married to Susan with whom he had eight children: Marguel, Jobaner, Rhudiza, Jarrel, Emily Rose, Pachel Baron, Rudyard James and Erna Sue.

Career 
A prolific writer, Lariosa wrote 300 poems, 140 stories, dramas, and novels. The first of two-volume folk epic entitled "Kalisub", considered the first epic written in Cebuano language, that he authored was serialized in Bisaya magazine. His works appeared in various publications such as Alimyon, Bag-ong Suga, Focus Philippines, Graphic, Philippines Free Press,Sands & Corrals, Sun Star Weekend, and Women's Journal.

He was co-chairman and one of the founding members of Bathalad (Bathalanong Halad sa Dagang, Inc), a Cebuano literary writers group, and its predecessor, the ALBICALARIVI Poetry Group. By the invitation of Pachico A. Seares, he became literary editor, columnist, and the second language consultant of Sun Star Superbalita, a Cebuano tabloid, and authored a Cebuano language style book. Aside from his writing career, he was a regional licensing chief of the National Food Authority.

Lariosa died on August 20, 2019, from liver complications in Mandaue City. He was scheduled to appear in Mugna Creative Writing Center of Cebu Normal University on August 24, 2019, where he was expected to launch his first poetry book, "Bangaw sa Alimungaw". His family attended the book's launching in his stead.

Impact 
According to Hope Yu's critique on several of his writings, particularly the Palanca-award-winning short story "Bugti" (Exchange), "Lariosa shows that he comprehends nature to be a part of the human, as well as the cultural, and the social imagination as much as it is a physical entity to be experienced... By examining Lariosa's work, we see that he developed an environmental philosophy that sought to take on the destructive forms of human domination that affect the natural and social Cebuano landscape."

Lariosa was recognized as the "Vanguard of Cebuano Literature" by the Cebu City government by virtue of Resolution No. 652 enacted in 2003. He was also one of the most anthologized writers belonging to the Bathalad group. Sun Star Cebu dedicated an editorial in his memory, writing, "A mentor to many young writers in Cebu, a friend to many, a loving father and husband, “Erning,” as he was fondly called, had written his last poem: “Dinhi na lang kutob ang paghandom/May gitisok kong utlanan.” (Memory ends here/I have marked an end.) Ah, but the words outlive this great Cebuano." Bong Wenceslao, a Sun Star columnist, said, "Ernie championed writers in Cebuano, the reason why Bathalad was formed. There are many so-called champions of the Cebuano language but only few who are also writers or who are also passionate of the writing craft." According to Sun Star, his and Julian Daan's deaths were an immense loss to Cebuano culture.

Awards 

 1972 Writing Fellow of Silliman National Summer Writers Workshop
1980 Gintong Butil Award for Best Publication Editor by National Food Authority
 1991 Cultural Center of the Philippines Literature Grant for Cebuano plays
 1993 Cultural Center of the Philippines Literature Grant for Cebuano criticism
1993 Bathalad Writer of the Year
 1997 Don Carlos Palanca Award for Cebuano short story "Bugti"
 1998 Don Carlos Palanca Award for Cebuano short story "Baybayon ni Simon"
 2003 Don Carlos Palanca Award for Cebuano short story "Sakdapanay"
2003 Gawad Pambansang Alagad in Balagtas for poetry and story from the Unyon ng mga Manunulat sa Pilipinas
2004 National Fellow in the University of the Philippines "Likhaan" for Regional Literature
2004 Most Outstanding Alumnus for Literature and Journalism by the Southwestern University
2005 Bathalad Writer of the Year
2006 Bathalad Hall of Famer in Cebuano Poetry
2011 Cebu Archdiocesan Mass Media Award Best Column Writer
2013 Cebu Archdiocesan Mass Media Award Best Column Writer
2013 Taboan Literary Award from the National Commission for Culture and the Arts
2019 Bathalad Top 15 Literary Writers in Cebuano in the Post-World War II Era

Books 

 Crackshots and other stories. Translated and edited by Hope Yu. Cebu City: University of San Carlos. 2010
Kaliring: Pinungpong mga balak ug sugilanon, Ernesto D. Lariosa, Pantaleon S. Auman, Lamberto G. Ceballos. BATHALAD. 1998
The History of San Fernando. Provincial Government of Cebu. 2014
The History of Carmen. Provincial Government of Cebu. 2014
Bangaw sa Alimungaw. Lapu-lapu City: Alesna Integrated School. 2019

See also 
 Cebuano literature

References 

Cebuano people
1944 births
Cebuano writers
Visayan writers
Filipino writers
Writers from Cebu
Southwestern University alumni
Palanca Award recipients
2019 deaths